The 1926–27 FBUs Mesterskabsrække was the 23rd season of the Funen Football Championship since its establishment in 1904 under the administration of Fyns Boldspil-Union (FBU). This was the first season played under the new name, Mesterskabsrækken, after the top-flight Funen league had previously been named A-rækken, a name that was passed on to the Funen second tier league. The launch of the season began on 26 September 1926 with three matches and the final round of regular league fixtures were played in April 1927 with the play-off matches being held on 1–8 May 1927. Svendborg BK were the defending league champions. The winner of the league would automatically qualify for the semifinals of the Provincial championship tournament that was held as part of the 1926–27 Landsfodboldturneringen that was played at the end of the regular season. The three highest ranking teams in the final standings participated in the inaugural season of the new Danish Championship play-off structure, the 1927–28 Danmarksmesterskabsturneringen i Fodbold. All eligible teams in the FBUs Mesterskabsrække including the best teams of the 1926–27 FBUs A-række would also participate in the next season of the Funen regional cup tournament, 1927 FBUs Pokalturnering.

The winner of the league were B 1909, who secured their fourth FBU top-flight title, after two championship replay matches was played against B 1913, as a consequence of both teams finishing level on points at the top of the table. During the fall season, B 1913 secured the regional cup title by defeating Odense BK in the 1926 FBUs Pokalturnering finale. Both, the newly promoted team, BK Marienlyst and Nyborg G&IF also finished level on points and last in the Funen FA's primary football league and an additional match had to scheduled to find the team that would participate in the promotion/relegation play-off match against the winner of the 1926–27 FBUs A-række, Middelfart G&IK. Even though losing the replay match, Nyborg G&IF managed to win the promotion/relegation play-off match, securing their spot in the next season of FBUs Mesterskabsrække.

Season summary

The season was officially launched on 26 September 1926 with three league matches featuring B 1913 versus Odense BK at B 1913's home ground in Odense, newly promoted BK Marienlyst versus the defending regional league champions Svendborg BK at BM's home ground and Nyborg G&IF versus B 1909 at NG&IF's home ground at Nyborg. Along with the Funen league's name change from A-rækken to Mesterskabsrækken, a completely new tournament schedule and several laws were implemented. The remaining regional Funen leagues would begin playing their first rounds the following Sunday, while the regional top flight league would have a match-free weekend. The first goal of the season being scored by B 1913's forward Carl Hansen after five minutes of play in front of a crowd of 5–600 spectators, with B 1913 eventually winning the game 4–2 against Odense BK. The match between B 1913 and Odense BK was a repetition of the 1926 edition's final of FBUs Pokalturnering that had been played three weeks prior to the first match day, which had also been won by B 1913. Newly promoted BK Marienlyst secured their place in the league this season by winning the promotion/relegation play-off match against Dalum BK.

On 10 April 1927, B 1909 won their match against the other league title contender B 1913, securing an advantage on points before the last round. In the season's last round of league fixtures on 24 April 1927, both the league championship (and hence participation in the 1926–27 Landsfodboldturneringen) and the relegation play-off spot, including participation in the 1927–28 Danmarksmesterskabsturneringen was yet undetermined — two teams were competing for the Funen Championship, while the four lowest teams were in proximity (2 points between all clubs) of the relegation play-off match against the winner of the 1926–27 FBUs A-række. Svendborg BK]played in Svendborg against the league championship contender B 1909 and drew the match to a 4–4 tie, Odense BK won their match 6–1 on their own home field, Munke Mose in Odense, against BK Marienlyst, and Nyborg G&IF lost their home match in Nyborg against the other league championship contender B 1909 with the score 0–5. These results meant that the top two clubs (B 1909 and B 1913) and the two bottom teams (BK Marienlyst and Nyborg G&IF) in the league were now equal on points and additional matches had to be scheduled to determine their final positions the league table.

Teams

Stadia and locations

League table
A total of six teams were contesting the league, including 5 sides from the 1925–26 season and one team, BK Marienlyst, promoted from the 1925–26 FBUs B-række. Every team played two games against each other team, one at home and one away. Teams received two points for a win and one point for a draw. If two or more teams were tied on points, places were determined by goal average unless this concerned the Funen Championship, national championship or qualification for promotion/relegation play-offs, in which case replay matches were scheduled. The team with the most points were crowned champions, while the team with the fewest points would enter a promotion/relegation play-off.

Results

Season statistics

Top scorers
B 1909's top scorer in the league became Creutz Jensen with 13 goals followed by Emil Petersen with 6 goals.

Hat-tricks

 4 Player scored 4 goals

Funen Championship replays
The two Odense-based clubs, B 1909 and B 1913, both finished level on points (13) at the top of the final standings. A replay match was scheduled at a neutral playing field, Munke Mose (OB's Bane; field owned by Odense BK), to determine the Funen League Championship, which ended in a 2–2 tie after the ordinary playing time (with the 1–1 in each half) and 3–3 tie after extra time (two times 15 minutes following a short break) with both goals scored in the first half of the extended time. In order to determine the championship during this match, an additional 15 minutes was played with an early implementation of the golden goal rule (g.e.t./g.g.) — the first team to score a goal wins the match — but no more goals were scored in this period. A second replay match was hence played, which was eventually won by B 1909, who were crowned Fynsmestre for the 1926/27-season. The final two matches of the Funen Championship saw an unprecedented number of spectators to a competitive match on Funen, with the close run of the replays attracting a new attendance record of around 3,000 spectators. The league matches in the original schedule between the two teams were attended by 1,000 and 1,100 spectators during the season. The second replay match was played on the same ground the following weekend, where B 1909 won 3–2, securing the championship (Fynsmesterskabet) and being crowned Fynsmestre (English: Funen Champions) after a 3–0 lead shortly into the second half of the game. There was a very similar team line-up for the two matches, where only the B 1909-player Jens Nielsen had been replaced by a substitute. There was speculation in the local newspaper, Fyens Stiftstidende, that a drawing of lots would be necessary to determine the championship, if the second replay match had also ended in a tie.

Promotion/relegation play-offs
BK Marienlyst and Nyborg G&IF both finished level on points in the table and a qualification play-off match was scheduled to determine the team, that was going to finish last in the league standings, hence participating in the promotion/relegation play-off. Nyborg G&IF (NG&IF) lost the replay match 4–2, played just ahead of the championship replay-match on the same field, with the score 2–1 in each half, and therefore met the winners of the 1926–27 FBUs A-række, Middelfart G&IK (MG&IK), for a spot in the next season of the FBUs Mesterskabsrække. The promotion/relegation play-off match, also played on the same field after the championship replay game, between Nyborg G&IF and Middelfart G&IK was won by East Funen team and both clubs therefore remained in their respective tiers for the 1927/28–season. The majority of the spectators present at the Championship match, played earlier in the day, stayed to watch the first part of the promotion/relegation match, which was dominated by Nyborg G&IF.

References

1926-27
1
Denmark